František Wirth (7 March 1915 – 1 June 2003) was a Czech gymnast. He competed in eight events at the 1948 Summer Olympics.

References

1915 births
2003 deaths
Czech male artistic gymnasts
Olympic gymnasts of Czechoslovakia
Gymnasts at the 1948 Summer Olympics
Gymnasts from Prague